Josh Fox is an American film director, playwright and environmental activist, best known for his Oscar-nominated, Emmy-winning 2010 documentary, Gasland. He is one of the most prominent public opponents of hydraulic fracturing and horizontal drilling. He is the founder and artistic director of a film and theater company in New York City, International WOW, and has contributed as a journalist to Rolling Stone, The Daily Beast, NowThis, AJ+ and Huffington Post.

Early life and education 

Fox was born on July 24, 1975, and lived in Milanville, Pennsylvania. He is Jewish. He went to PS 6 in New York City, Wagner Junior High School and Columbia Preparatory School for High School.  He attended Columbia University, majoring in theater, and graduated in 1995. Fox worked as an actor in Chicago in the early 1990s, and was featured in numerous plays including Drunkboat with Tracy Letts, Jim True and Michael Shannon at Steppenwolf theatre, Goose and TomTom by David Rabe at the Theater Building, and The Love of the Nightingale directed by Amy Landecker at the Next Theater.  Beginning in 1994, Fox trained extensively with Anne Bogart, and SITI Company members Ellen Lauren, Will Bond, Stephen Webber and Barney O’Hanlon in Viewpoints, Suzuki and Composition.

Artistic career 

Fox founded the film and theatre company International WOW Company in Chiang Mai, Thailand in 1996 with a group of performers from New York City and Asia. He has written and directed over 30 plays with his ensemble. Notable works include ?WOW! (1996), This is Not the Ramakian (1997), Stairway to the Stars (1999),  HyperReal America (2001), The Bomb (2002), Orphan on God's Highway (2002), Death of Nations Parts 1-4 (2003-6), The Comfort and Safety of Your Own Home (2004),The Expense of Spirit (2004), Limitless Joy (2005), Surrender (2008), and Solutions Grassroots (2014). In addition, Josh has written, directed, and produced seven feature films, and over 25 short films, which have premiered in New York, Asia and around Europe. The New York Times has hailed him as “one of the most adventurous impresarios of the New York avant-garde” and Time Out NY called him “one of downtown’s most audacious auteurs,” citing his “brilliantly resourceful mastery of stagecraft.”

In addition to his work with International WOW Company, Fox has participated as an actor, director, designer and writer in numerous international theater collaboration projects in Japan, Thailand, the Philippines and Germany.  He starred as David Conde in Yoji Sakate's Emperor and Kiss performed by the Rinko Gun company, along with Kameron Steele, marking the first time that the company worked with a western performers.  He was also the first western performer to work with Pappa Tarahumara dance/theatre company, creating roles for WD (2001) and The Sound of Future Sync (2002) which performed at the Setagaya Public Theatre and the New National Theatre in Tokyo. He created Heimwehen, Death of Nations Part V (2006) with Frank Raddatz, the former dramaturg of Heiner Muller, for the Forum Freies Theatre in Düsseldorf.  Fox was a frequent collaborator of Filipino playwright, actor and screenwriter Rody Vera throughout the early 2000s.

In 2008, Fox directed his first narrative feature film, Memorial Day, an examination of American party culture, the Iraq War and torture which was executive produced by Jim McKay and Michael Stipe of R.E.M. In 2010, he wrote, directed, and produced Gasland, one of the first major films about the environmental impacts of fracking.  Gasland premiered at the Sundance Film Festival in competition, winning the critics poll and the Special Jury Prize for Documentary.  The film is widely credited as galvanizing the anti-fracking movement worldwide, making fracking a household word. Josh later produced the HBO sequel Gasland Part II, which aired July 2013 and was released on DVD in January 2014.

On October 1, 2015, Fox's mini-documentary GasWork, which detailed the hazardous working conditions in the hydraulic fracturing oil and gas drilling industry, debuted on All In with Chris Hayes.

In 2016, Fox directed How to Let Go of the World and Love All the Things Climate Can't Change, a personal take on climate change, the film features many notable figures on climate change such as Bill McKibben, Michael Mann, Van Jones, the Pacific Climate Warriors, and Elizabeth Kolbert. Josh was awarded his third Environmental Media Association award for Best Documentary for his film How to Let Go of the World and Love All the Things Climate Can't Change, which premiered at the Sundance Film Festival in 2016, toured the world theatrically and was released on HBO in June 2016.

In 2017, he produced, co-directed and co-wrote AWAKE, A DREAM FROM STANDING ROCK with indigenous filmmakers Doug Good Feather and Myron Dewey, which premiered at the Tribeca Film Festival on Earth Day, launched on Netflix and toured to hundreds of locations around the world.  In 2018 he co-founded the AWAKE MEDIA FELLOWSHIP for indigenous youth with leaders Stephanie Cassidy, Doug Good Feather and others.

In 2018, Fox created The Truth Has Changed, a solo performance, book and film about misinformation, propaganda and psycho-graphic targeting aimed at manipulating our current media and political ecosystem.  In the performance he tells of his extensive frontline reporting with an emphasis on the smear campaigns waged against him for nearly a decade by the fossil fuel industry. The project has toured to over 25 cities in the US and Europe and has been seen by thousands of people in support of dozens progressive, environmental and grassroots organizations. The Truth Has Changed is Fox's first book, published by Seven Stories Press. In January 2020 The Public Theater abruptly ended Fox's run on The Truth Has Changed following a dispute with the theater.  Fox and International WOW Company staff including producer Diane Crespo alleged that Public Theater staff had physically attacked Fox while preparing for a show.  Fox also alleged that festival director Mark Russell was verbally abusive to him before shows.  Fox and the company submitted several formal written complaints about code of conduct violations and while pursuing these complaints the show's run of three remaining shows was halted.  Fox was asked to meet with Public Theater Artistic Director Oskar Eustis and associate artistic director Shanta Thake months later in hopes of finding a reconciliation wherein Ms Thake remarked "mistakes were made" by the Public Theatre staff.  The feature film version of The Truth Has Changed was released in 2021.

In March 2020, during the covid lockdown Mr. Fox launched Staying Home with Josh Fox a nightly interview program featuring guests from the world of politics, cinema, and music.  Guests on the program included Reverend William Barber, Cory Bush, Alexis Krauss, Alex Ebert, Dougie Bowne, Marc Ribot, Anne Bogart, Chris Smalls, Cenk Uygur, Nick Panken, Marquita Bradshaw, Kim Stanley Robinson, Alexander Zaitchik, Doug GoodFeather, Myron Dewey, Preston Reed, Tommie Sunshine, Ayana Elizabeth Johnson, John Boutte, Jamie Margolin, Rebekah Jones among others.  The show ran for more than 200 episodes on The Young Turks network in 2020 and 2021.

Activism 
Fox is known for his opposition of hydraulic fracturing, or fracking. He has campaigned for a ban on fracking and against the gas industry's exploitation of loopholes in the Clean Water act and the Safe Drinking Water Act.

In 2011 Mr. Fox co-founded The Solutions Project with actor Mark Ruffalo, scientist Mark Z. Jacobson and banker Marco Krapels with the aim of moving the United States towards 100% renewable energy, including the use of wind power and solar power.  Although Mr. Fox envisioned the group to be a grassroots organization to promote renewable energy, in 2014 the board voted down grassroots organizing work and began to emphasize PR and marketing campaigns by Ruffalo and other celebrities.  Mr. Fox was forcibly removed from the board in 2016 by Ruffalo and Executive Director Sarah Shanley Hope after he complained the organization was too heavily dependent on celebrity.  All founders except Mark Ruffalo were removed from the board in subsequent years.  In 2021, The Solutions Project accepted 43 million dollars from Jeff Bezos and the Bezos Earth Fund an action which was condemned by Mr. Fox as helping to greenwash Bezos and the large carbon footprint and unfair labor practices of Amazon.

In February 2012 Fox was arrested during a U.S. House of Representatives subcommittee hearing on hydraulic fracturing when he attempted to videotape the proceedings.

Josh was advisor to Artists Against Fracking, Damascus Citizens and many other organizations involved in the successful fight to ban fracking in New York State and the Delaware River Basin. Fox's films have toured to hundreds of cities worldwide helping to form the global movement against fracking.

In 2016, he worked as a surrogate for Senator Bernie Sanders as the Creative Director for Our Revolution and as a member of the campaign's NY Platform Committee. He worked alongside Bill McKibben, Nina Turner, Ben Jealous, Jane Kleeb and Dr. Cornel West to pass an amendment to the Democratic Platform which addressed carbon pricing, the phasing out of natural gas power plants, community involvement, and adopting the Keystone XL climate standard for all federal energy projects.

Personal life
In 2008, Fox's family was offered $100,000 in order to allow a natural gas fracking company to use his land in northern Pennsylvania. Fox set out to learn more about the fracking industry. After doubting some of the natural gas company's claims, he went on a mission to research them further, crossing the country visiting other gas fields. His experiences lead to his anti-fracking activism.

Awards and nominations 
Fox was awarded the 2010 LennonOno Grant for Peace by Yoko Ono.

Gasland premiered at the 2010 Sundance Film Festival, where it was awarded the 2010 Special Jury Prize for Documentary. It was also nominated for Best Documentary Screenplay by the WGA and was awarded the Environmental Media Association Award for Best Documentary.

Fox received a 2011 Academy Award Nomination for Best Documentary for Gasland. He won the 2011 Primetime Emmy for Best Nonfiction Directing, in addition to three other Primetime Emmy nominations that year.
 
Gasland Part II premiered on HBO July 8, 2013 won the 2013 Environmental Media Association award for Best Documentary, the Best Film at the Wild and Scenic Film Festival, and the Hell Yeah Prize from Cinema Eye honors. It was nominated for a 2013 News and Documentary Emmy.

How to Let Go of the World and Love All the Things Climate Can't Change premiered at the Sundance Film Festival in 2016, and won the Environmental Advocacy award at the Washington DC Environmental Film Festival. The film was awarded the 2016 Environmental Media Association Award for Best Documentary, Fox's third consecutive win in that category.

For his theatre work, Fox has received five grants from the National Endowment for the Arts, five MAP Fund Grants, a Drama Desk Award Nomination, and an Otto Award.

Filmography 
 Memorial Day (2008) – directed
 Gasland (2010) – directed, wrote, produced
  The Sky is Pink (short) (2012) – directed, wrote, produced, co-editor (with Matt Sanchez)
 Gasland Part II (2013) – directed, wrote, produced
 Gaswork: The Fight for CJ's Law (short) (2013)
 How to Let Go of the World and Love All the Things Climate Can't Change (2016) – directed, wrote, produced
 Awake, A Dream from Standing Rock (2017) – co-directed, co-wrote, produced
 Staying Home with Josh Fox (2020–21)
 The Truth Has Changed (2021) – written, directed
  The Edge of Nature (2023) - written, directed, produced, music

Works for the Stage 

 ?WOW! (1996) – conceived, directed
 American Interference (1997) – conceived, directed
  This is NOT the Ramakian  (1997) – conceived, directed
 The Sleeping and The Dead (1998) – conceived, directed
 Stairway to The Stars (1999) – conceived, directed
 HyperReal America (2001) – conceived, directed
 Soon My Work (2001) – written, directed
  THE BOMB  (2002) – conceived, directed
 Orphan on God's Highway (2002) – conceived, directed
 Death of Nations Parts 1-5 - THE TRAILER, THE THAI PLAY, HEIMWEHEN, HOW TO LET GO OF THE SUN' (2003-2006) – conceived, directed
 The Comfort And Safety of Your Own Home (2004) – conceived, directed
 The Expense of Spirit (2004) – written, directed
  Limitless Joy  (2005) – written, directed
 You Belong To Me (2006) – written, directed
 SURRENDER (2008) – written, directed
 RECONSTRUCTION (2010) – written, directed
 Solutions Grassroots (2014) – written, directed
  The Truth Has Changed  (2020) – written, directed

See also
 Anti-fracking movement
 The Solutions ProjectGasland''

References

External links
 
 
 International WOW Company, Fox's theatre organization

1972 births
Living people
American documentary film directors
American environmentalists
Jewish American dramatists and playwrights
Columbia College (New York) alumni
People from Wayne County, Pennsylvania
Film directors from Pennsylvania
21st-century American Jews